Stella Fakiyesi (born c. 1971) is a Nigerian creative photographer, cinematographer and painter. Fakiyesi's works in photography and visual art have been featured in many international exhibitions.

Biography 
Fakiyesi was born in Nigeria. She studied photography at Ontario College of Art & Design University from 1993 to 1997. After her graduation in 1997, Fakiyesi started working on her solo career practice in Toronto, Canada. She founded and operated the SOF Art House, a gallery and co-work space for photographers in Toronto from 1999 to 2005.

Selected exhibitions 

 2019 Refections of Love | Harbourfront Centre
 2018 - 2019 Everything Remains | Art Gallery of Sudbury
 2018 Everything Remains | Raw McMichael Gallery.
 2016  Position As Desired | Exploring African Canadian Identity Art Gallery of Windsor.
 2012  Position As Desired | Canadian Museum of Immigration Halifax, Nova Scotia.
 2010 - 2011 Position As Desired | Royal Ontario Museum (ROM) Toronto, Canada.
 2005 Amiala | Harbourfront Centre Toronto, Canada.
 1998- 2000 History of African Photography from 1840 to Present group show | Paris, São Paulo, Mexico City, Washington, D.C., Cape Town, South Africa.
 1999 Portrait Afrika group show | Haus Der Kulturen Der Welt, Berlin.

See also 
 Ade Adekola
 Nengi Omuku

References

External links 
 Website
 

Year of birth missing (living people)
Living people
Nigerian painters
Yoruba women artists
Women printmakers
Nigerian expatriates in Canada